Beechboro Road is a north–south arterial road located in the northeastern suburbs of Perth, Western Australia, connecting Morley and Bayswater with areas further north. Until the construction of the nearby section of Tonkin Highway between 1984 and 1992, and later, during the NorthLink WA road project between 2016 and 2019, Beechboro Road was one of northeastern Perth's most important routes. The road is discontinuous at Tonkin Highway, with the section from Tonkin Highway to Walter Road officially known as Beechboro Road North, and the section running through Bayswater as Beechboro Road South.

Beechboro Road North is allocated State Route 53 for almost its entire length. Prior to 2019, this allocation extended northwards to Gnangara Road, but had since been truncated at Tonkin Highway and Hepburn Avenue due to the NorthLink WA road project.

Route description

Beechboro Road South 
The road is mostly a two-lane single carriageway and runs through residential and some industrial areas upon reaching its northern end.

Beechboro Road South commences at a traffic light controlled T-junction with Coode Street in the Bayswater town centre. The road initially runs through residential areas but transitions to industrial areas after . Another  takes the road to a traffic light controlled intersection with Collier Road.

Beechboro Road North 
The road is mostly two lanes in each direction which alternates between single and dual carriageway.

Beechboro Road North commences at a cul-de-sac north of Tonkin Highway in Embleton.  later, the road encounters a traffic light intersection with Broun Avenue to the west and Walter Road East to the east, gaining the State Route 53 north of that intersection. Now within the suburb of Morley and a four-lane single carriageway, the road intersects at traffic lights with Morley Drive East  later, and then, now a dual carriageway, another  later takes the road to Benara Road, also at traffic lights. The road travels through the suburb of Beechboro for another  before reaching Reid Highway, which Beechboro Road passes over, with the two roads having had formerly intersected with each other at traffic lights before 2018. Following this flyover the suburb is now within the residential suburb of Bennett Springs, encountering a roundabout with Orchid Avenue and Bridgeman Drive and a T-junction with Bennett Springs Drive, all within  before intersecting with Marshall Road at traffic lights. Beechboro Road North ends at a roundabout interchange with Tonkin Highway, continuing westwards as Hepburn Avenue.

History 
The road was first commissioned during the 1970s as a road that tracked the then-new northeastern suburbs of Perth, running all the way to Gnangara Road.

Upon the completion of the nearby section of Tonkin Highway from Railway Parade to Morley Drive in 1984, Beechboro Road was split into two parts, becoming discontinuous on both sides of the highway. In 1992, the intersection with Reid Highway opened when it was extended eastwards from Tonkin Highway. The location of this intersection required impact analysis and environmental review.

In 2010, a new extension of Hepburn Avenue to Beechboro Road North opened nearby, resulting in the latter being realigned with Beechboro Road traffic coming from the south continuing as Pass Way that would terminate at Hepburn Avenue. To continue onto Beechboro Road North, traffic had to turn right at the roundabout. This alignment was later removed in 2018 as part of nearby works for the NorthLink WA project.

Beechboro Road North was heavily affected during the NorthLink WA road project during 2018 and 2019. The intersection with Reid Highway was converted to a flyover due to its close proximity to the combination interchange between Reid and Tonkin Highways. The road was also realigned to connect with Hepburn Avenue at a roundabout interchange with Tonkin Highway, which shortened its original length by nearly 7 km, and the road was duplicated in the vicinity of the interchange. The section from Hepburn Avenue to Gnangara Road was also affected due to Tonkin Highway crossing its path and passing just south of its original northern terminus with Gnangara Road, with said section becoming a cul-de-sac at its northern end, and renamed Hennessey Road.

Hennessey Road 
Hennessey Road is the current name of the original section of Beechboro Road North between Hepburn Avenue and Gnangara Road. This section of the route provided a link to Gnangara Road and Ellenbrook from Marshall Road when it was still part of Beechboro Road North, as well as provide access to the Cullacabardee community and Whiteman Park hobby clubs, which it still does today. As a result of the NorthLink WA works, the road was permanently closed north of Jules Steiner Memorial Drive (the entrance road to the shooting complex) in January 2019, and reduced to a local access road. The road is accessible from a left-in/left-out intersection at Beechboro Road North.

Major intersections

Beechboro Road North:
  Tonkin Highway, Ballajura, Whiteman and Cullacabardee (roundabout interchange, continues as  Hepburn Avenue westwards)
 Marshall Road, Whiteman and Beechboro
 Benara Road, Morley
  Morley Drive East (State Route 76) - Morley
  Walter Road East (State Route 53 west) - Embleton and Bayswater

Beechboro Road South:
 Collier Road - Embleton and Bayswater
 Railway Parade - Bayswater
 Coode Street - Bayswater

Former intersections
The following intersections were removed during 2018-19 as part of the NorthLink WA project.
  Gnangara Road (State Route 84), Whiteman and Lexia (formerly traffic light intersection, now replaced by the Tonkin Highway and Gnangara Road interchange)
  Reid Highway (State Route 3), Beechboro (formerly traffic light intersection, now a flyover)

See also

References 

Roads in Perth, Western Australia